Kenne is a given name and a surname. 

Notable people with the given name include:
Kenne Duncan (1903–1972), Canadian actor
Kenne Fant (1923–2016), Swedish actor, director, and writer

Notable people with the surname include:
Leslie F. Kenne (born 1949), United States Air Force veteran
Raoul Kenne (born 1994), Cameroonian footballer